Sanya Airbase is a military air base located on Hainan Island, China. The airbase is a highly strategic location, being part of the Southern Theater Command, and within easy flying distance of the disputed islands in the South China Sea. Hainan Island is also host to a second military air base: Lingshui Air Base.

History
Analysis of Google Earth imagery since 2018 shows Lingshui Airbase is undergoing extensive redevelopment of its aircraft parking areas.

Operations
Sanya is one of the Chinese bases which supports the Guizhou Soar Dragon and recent imagery has confirmed the UAVs presence. The base is also home to Harbin Z-9 helicopters.

References

Airports in Hainan
Chinese Air Force bases